Piet van der Wolk ( – ) was a Dutch male footballer. He was part of the Netherlands national football team, playing 6 matches. He played his first match on 13 March 1910.

See also
 List of Dutch international footballers

References

1892 births
1952 deaths
Dutch footballers
Netherlands international footballers
Footballers from Rotterdam
Sparta Rotterdam players

Association footballers not categorized by position